In molecular biology, the protein domain eIF4-gamma/eIF5/eIF2-epsilon is a family of evolutionarily related proteins. This domain is found at the C-terminus of several translation Initiation factors. It was first detected at the very C-termini of the yeast protein GCD6, eIF-2B epsilon, and two other eukaryotic translation initiation factors, eIF-4 gamma and eIF-5 and it may be involved in the interaction of eIF-2B, eIF-4 gamma, and eIF-5 with eIF-2.

Function
In molecular biology, the eIF-W2 domain functions as the binding site for Mnk eIF4E kinase, an enzyme that phosphorylates eukaryotic initiation factor 4E (eIF4E). For eIF2B-epsilon, the W2 C-terminal domain functions in guanine nucleotide exchange on eIF2. For eIF5, the W2 domain functions in mediating the multifactor complex (MFC) formation with eIF1, eIF2-GTP, eIF3 and Met-tRNAiMet. The eIF5 W2 C-terminal domain and the adjacent N-terminal linker region is responsible for the GDI activity against eIF2-GDP.

Domain Structure
The W2 domain has a globular fold and is exclusively composed out of alpha-helices. The structure can be divided into a structural C-terminal core onto which the two N-terminal helices are attached. The core contains two aromatic/acidic residue-rich regions (AA boxes), which are important for mediating protein-protein interactions.

This entry covers the entire W2 domain, which is part of the TPR clan.

Translation
Translation initiation is a well regulated and highly coordinated cellular process in eukaryotes, in which at least 11 eukaryotic initiation factors (eIFs) are included. These factors come together to form the pre-initiation complex.

Eukaryotic initiation factors
The W2 domain (two invariant tryptophans) is a region of approximately 165 amino acids which is found in the C-terminus of the following eukaryotic initiation factors(eIFs):

Eukaryotic translation initiation factor 2B epsilon (eIF-2B-epsilon) 
Eukaryotic translation initiation factor 4 gamma (eIF-4-gamma) 
Eukaryotic translation initiation factor 5 (eIF-5), a GTPase-activating protein (GAP) specific for eIF2

Examples 
Genes encoding proteins containing this domain include AAG1, BZW1, BZW2, EIF2B5, EIF4G1, EIF4G2, EIF4G3, and EIF5.

References

Protein families